King's Song may refer to:

Royal anthems
Kongesangen, the royal anthem of Norway
Kungssången, the royal anthem of Sweden

Contemporary music
"Koningslied", a 2013 song written for the investiture of prince Willem-Alexander as King of the Netherlands. It was released on request of the Nationaal Comité Inhuldiging (the Dutch National Committee Inauguration)